This is a timeline of the presence of Orthodoxy in Greece from 1924 to 1974. The history of Greece traditionally encompasses the study of the Greek people, the areas they ruled historically, as well as the territory now composing the modern state of Greece.

Second Hellenic Republic (1924–1935)

1924 Constitution of the Holy Mountain agreed, ratified by the Greek State by the Legislative Decree of 10/16 September 1926; Greek Orthodox Archdiocese of Australia formally founded; death of Arsenios of Cappadocia.
1925 School of Theology established at the Aristotle University of Thessaloniki, due to the initiative taken by the government of Alexandros Papanastasiou.
1925–1945 Emigration of less than 30,000 Greeks to the United States, many of whom were "picture brides" for single Greek men.
1926 Proposal for Mount Athos to be turned into a condominium by Dictator Theodoros Pangalos, as part of the treaty signed on 17 August between Greece and the Kingdom of Serbs, Croats and Slovenes; the existing constitution governing the affairs of Mount Athos is passed.
1927-1954 Archim. Seraphim Papakostas (1872-1954) succeeds Archim. Eusebius Matthopoulos as head of the Zoe Brotherhood movement in Greece.
1928 The Ecumenical Patriarchate issued a tome by which it ceded to the Church of Greece, on a temporary basis, 35 of its metropolitan dioceses in northern Greece to be administered by it.
1930 Mustafa Kemal Atatürk officially renamed Constantinople to Istanbul, which comes from the Greek expression "eis-tin-polin" ("to the City"), based on the common Greek usage of referring to Constantinople simply as The City; a Pan-Orthodox Consultation on Mount Athos concluded that the only possible relations on the part of the Orthodox toward the Roman Catholics was "Relations of defense on the part of the Orthodox toward Roman Catholic Proselytism;" Traditionalist Greeks (Old Calendarist communities) began publishing the monthly journal Orthodoxos Keryx (Orthodox Herald) from 1930.

1930-1931 Rulings of the Court of Appeal (1930) and the Supreme Court (1931) imposed a ban on Uniates in Greece from wearing the outer garments of Orthodox clergy, in order to avoid the confusion with Orthodox clergy they were seeking, however the Uniates never consistently respected this decision.

1931 Benaki Museum opens in Athens, housing Byzantine, Post-Byzantine, and Neo-Hellenic ecclesiastical and national art collections.
1932 Death of Saint Nicholas Planas.
1933 Church of Greece bans Freemasonry, declaring that when one becomes a Mason (a member of Freemasonry) it is an act of apostasy from the Church and therefore, until that person repents, they can not attend the Holy Eucharist; opening of the new Patriarchal Palace in Cairo by Patriarch Meletios, built at the expense of Theodore Kotsikas.
 1934 Mustafa Kemal Atatürk transformed Hagia Sophia into a museum.
1935 Death of eminent prelate Metropolitan Germanos (Karavangelis) in Vienna, who had played a central role and was an active participant both in the Greek Struggle for Macedonia and in Pontus, and was a primary candidate for election to the Ecumenical Throne of Constantinople in 1921, and to be Archbishop of Athens in 1923, only to censured in the end by both church and state; Old Calendar schism, when three bishops declared their separation from the official Church of Greece stating that the calendar change was a schismatic act; German Biblical scholar Alfred Rahlfs published his two-volume  Septuaginta,  a semi-critical edition of the Greek Septuagint, being the only complete critical text of the Septuagint in existence to that date.

Kingdom of Greece restored (1935–1967)

1936 Apostolic Ministry of the Church of Greece founded ( 'Apostoliki Diakonia' ); General Ioannis Metaxas, Prime Minister of Greece during the 4th of August Regime (1936–41), propagated a Third Hellenic Civilization (Ancient Greece and Byzantium being the first two); by 1936, Zoe Brotherhood had opened 300 catechetical schools with 35,000 pupils, and received the first prize at the International Protestant Conference on Sunday Schools in Oslo.

1937 The Ecumenical Patriarchate chose a number of highly educated religious personalities for key positions in the recently declared Autocephalous Orthodox Church of Albania, after an agreement with the Albanian authorities, including Panteleimon (Kotokos) as Metr. of Gjirokastër, and Eulogios (Kourilas), as metropolitan of Korytsa; Mass NKVD operation against Greeks in the USSR begins, based on Joseph Stalin's Directive 50125 Dec. 1937, resulting in the loss of 38,000 Soviet citizens of Hellenic descent at the Gulags of Siberia.
1938 Death of Silouan of Mt Athos; Chrysanthos (Philippidis) becomes the Archbishop of Athens and all Greece (1938-1941); American Carpatho-Russian Orthodox Diocese is founded, when a group of 37 Ruthenian Eastern Catholic parishes, under the leadership of Fr. Orestes Chornock were received into the jurisdiction of the Ecumenical Patriarchate.

1939–49 World War II and subsequent Greek Civil War (1944–49), famine and widespread bloodshed.
1939 The emigration of the Antiochian Greeks reaches its peak.
1941 In occupied Athens, Abp. Chrysanthos refused to swear in the first Quisling government of Georgios Tsolakoglou appointed by the Germans.
1943 Massacre of Kalavryta by German occupation forces, including the monks and monastery of Agia Lavra; the Nazi attempt to exterminate the Jews of Athens fails, thanks to the combined efforts of Abp. Damaskinos (Papandreou) of Athens, Greek resistance groups and the Greek people.
1944 Abp. Damaskinos (Papandreou) of Athens serves as regent in an attempt to stabilise Greece (31 Dec 1944 – 28 Sep 1946).
1946 The Civil Code of Greece (Gr: Αστικός Κώδικας) came into effect on 23 February 1946.
1947 The Dodecanese Islands are liberated but remain under the Patriarchate of Constantinople; death of Venerable Saint Savvas the New of Kalymnos.
1949 Princess Andrew of Greece and Denmark founded an Orthodox nursing order of nuns known as the Christian Sisterhood of Martha and Mary, and built a convent and orphanage in a poor suburb of Athens.
1950 Uncovering of the relics of St. Ephraim of Nea Makri (†1426); foundation of the Albanian Orthodox Diocese of America under the Ecumenical Patriarchate, with the episcopal ordination on 10 September in Constantinople of Mark Lipa as titular Bishop of Levka (1950-1982).
1951 In June, the Church of Greece organized inter-orthodox events in commemoration of the 1900th anniversary of the Apostle Paul's mission to Athens;<ref> Ιστορία της Εκκλησίας των Αθηνών. Ιερά Αρχιεπισκοπή Αθηνών, 2015. Retrieved: 14 July 2015.</ref> the 1500th anniversary celebration of the Greek Orthodox Patriarchate of Jerusalem.
1952 The Holy Synod of the Church of Greece decided to commemorate the feast day of The Protection of the Mother of God on 28 October, rather than on the traditional date of 1 October, thus coinciding with Ohi Day in Greece; new monastery of Panagia Soumela built in the village of Kastania, in Macedonia, Greece, housing the wonder-working icon of Panagia Soumela, becoming a center of religious pilgrimage;Kiki Danaktsis. Greece's Most Celebrated Holy Virgin. Greek Reporter. 12 August 2010. Retrieved: 1 May 2013. Ecumenical Patr. Athenagoras I (Spyrou) officially visited, for the first time in the last one thousand years, the Papal representative in Constantinople, who returned the visit.
1953 The Athonite School was officially re-established in Mount Athos, now named the Athonite Ecclesiastical Academy, occupying a wing of the Skete of St. Andrew in Karyes, following the Greek secondary school curriculum combined with ecclesiastical education.
1955 Istanbul Pogrom: In September an organised mob was turned against the ethnic Greek community and the Ecumenical Patriarchate in an orchestrated pogrom, destroying 73 churches, 1,004 residences, 5,000 small- and medium-sized businesses, two cemeteries, 23 schools and 5 athletic centres; the number of ethnic Greeks who were forced to leave Turkey by 1960 as a result of these events is estimated at around 9,000;Speros Vryonis. The Mechanism of Catastrophe: The Turkish Pogrom Of September 6–7, 1955, And The Destruction Of The Greek Community Of Istanbul. Greekworks.Com Inc. May 2005. 659 pp.  Glorification of Nicodemos of the Holy Mountain (†1809) by the Patriarchate of Constantinople; the small Greek community in Venice devoted its resources and works of post-Byzantine art to founding the Hellenic Institute of Byzantine and Post-Byzantine Studies (Istituto Ellenico) on the site of the former Flanginian School, established by law in 1951 and starting its activity in 1955.
1956 Death of prominent theologian Gregorios Papamichael, professor at the University of Athens, who was responsible for resurrecting two almost forgotten great personalities of Orthodoxy: Gregorios Palamas and Maximos (Trivolis) the Greek, and who furthermore examined diligently various cultural aspects of church life; Dr. Constantine Cavarnos founds the Institute for Byzantine and Modern Greek Studies in Belmont, Massachusetts; prominent theologian Nikos Nissiotis (1926–86) defended his doctoral dissertation Existentialism and the Christian Faith, being the first time that a Greek confronted the problems raised by Kierkegaard, Jaspers, Heidegger and Sartre in the light of living Orthodox theological thought.

1957 Death of Blessed Elder Jeronymo (Ieronimos) abbot of Simonopetra.Χαρμόσυνες καμπάνες για την αγιοποίηση τεσσάρων γερόντων, dimokratianews Greek-American priest John Romanides publishes his doctoral dissertation The Ancestral Sin  with the approval of the Theological Faculty of the University of Athens, representing a classic, landmark work in the theological revolution of the 1960s that set an unimpeachable standard of Orthodoxy.
1958 Pope John XXIII and Ecumenical Patr. Athenagoras I (Spyrou) exchanged formal letters calling for peace among the Christian churches.

1959 Death of Blessed Elder Joseph (Spilaiotis) the Hesychast; death of Venerable Elder and New Confessor George (Karslidis) of Drama;Great Synaxaristes: Ὁ Ὅσιος Γεώργιος Καρσλίδης. 4 Νοεμβρίου. ΜΕΓΑΣ ΣΥΝΑΞΑΡΙΣΤΗΣ. the Zoe Brotherhood edition of the New Testament had sold over 650,000 copies by 1959; Hieromonk Augoustinos Kantiotes founds the Society of Theologians  "The Cross" ("O Stavros") , which assumed the form of a brotherhood in 1966; Abp. Anastasios (Yannoulatos) of Albania establishes inter-Orthodox mission agency  Porefthentes (Go Ye)  to revive the church's mission activities.
1960 Death of Venerable Saint Anthimos of Chios; death of Archimandrite Iakovos Valodimos of Monodendri, Ioannina (1870-1960), ascetic and confessor. πατήρ Ιάκωβος Βαλοδήμος, ένας άγνωστος άνθρωπος τού Θεού... ΘΗΣΑΥΡΟΣ ΓΝΩΣΕΩΝ ΚΑΙ ΕΥΣΕΒΕΙΑΣ(Ι). 16 June 2015. Retrieved: 3 September 2015.
1961 Glorification of Nektarios of Pentapolis (†1920); first ever visit of a Greek Orthodox Patriarch to Canada, as Patr. Benedict I of Jerusalem begins a North-American tour to raise funds for the restoration of the shrines in the Holy Land; Greek language ultraconservative ecclesiastical newspaper  Orthodoxos Typos (Orthodox Press) is founded by Archimandrite Charalambos Vasilopoulos (1910–1982);{{#tag:ref|"Archimandrite Charalambos Vasilopoulos (1910–1982) was one of the leading figures of the Greek Orthodox anti-ecumenical movement, and is still held in high esteem in conservative ecclesiastical circles. In 1959, he founded a religious society (the POE, Panhellenic Orthodox Union) with an anti-heretical agenda, and in 1961 he established the newspaper Orthodoxos Typos (Orthodox Press), which continues to be the chief voice of Orthodox fundamentalism. He was abbot of Moni Petraki monastery from 1962 to 1968. He published a huge number of biographies of saints, initially in collaboration with Fotis Kontoglou, which have collectively sold in the hundreds of thousands and still retain their popularity. Archimandrite Vasilopoulos’ favourite word was the verb ‘to uncover’. Everywhere he went he saw hidden enemies of Orthodoxy and of the nation (ecumenists, freemasons, Jehovah’s Witnesses, and, above all, Jews), and considered it his duty to expose them. Hence the titles of his books, all published by Orthodox Press Publications, at very low prices and in tens of thousands of copies: Uncovering Freemasonry (1967); Jewish Freemasonry Revealed (1975), an extended version of the former; Ecumenism Unmasked (1971); Uncovering Jehovah’s Witnesses (undated); The Rotary Club Unmasked (undated); Theosophy Uncovered (1973);  ‘Inspired Women’ Unmasked;; (1977)."|group=note}} death of Metr. Eulogios (Kourilas) of Korytsa (Korçë), one of the leaders of the Northern Epirus movement.
1962 Foundation of Monastery of the Annunciation of the Virgin Mary, in Oinousses (Metropolis of Chios, Psara and Oinouses).
1962–68 The 12-Volume  "Religious and Ethical Encyclopedia"  (Θρησκευτική και Ηθική Εγκυκλοπαίδεια, ΘΗΕ) is compiled as a joint effort between academics, university scholars and other contributors, published by the Athanasios Martinos publishing house, Athens.
1963 Soter Brotherhood is created, as the more traditionalist members broke away from the Zoe Brotherhood to form a smaller new brotherhood under the leadership of Prof. Panagiotes N. Trembelas, having a profound influence on the Church of Greece; Second Pan-Orthodox Conference held in Rhodes; 1000th anniversary celebration of founding of Mount Athos; Archimandrite Chrysostomos Papasarantopoulos founds the Orthodox missionary society "The Friends of Uganda", known today as the "Orthodox Missionary Fraternity" (Αδελφότητα Ορθοδόξου Εξωτερικής Ιεραποστολής).
1964 The skull of St. Andrew the Apostle, the martyred Patron Saint of Greece, was returned to the Greek Orthodox Church as a gesture of Church unity by Pope Paul VI; death of Nicephorus the Leper; Panagia Malevi icon of the Mother of God begins gushing myrrh, at the Malevi Monastery, at Agios Petros, Arcadia; Third Pan-Orthodox Conference held in Rhodes; in March, Turkey denounced the 1930 bilateral agreement on disputes arising from the exchange of populations and expelled more than 17,000 ethnic Greeks, who were deprived of all access to their real estate, goods and chattels, subsequently followed by the de facto exodus of 40,000 ethnic Greeks of Turkish citizenship.
1965 Death of icon painter Photios Kontoglou, who was a strong influence in the reintroduction of traditional Byzantine and postbyzantine style in church icon painting; first Metropolitan for Piraeus is elected, Chrysostomos (Tabladorakis) of Argolidos; Monastery of Panagia Pantanassa (Kranidiou) founded; Pope Paul VI of Rome and Patr. Athenagoras I (Spyrou) of Constantinople mutually nullify the excommunications of 1054; translation of the Holy Relics of Venerable Sabbas the Sanctified from the church of Sant'Antonin, Venice, back to the Holy Lavra of Saint Sabbas the Sanctified, preceded by consultations between Pope Paul VI and Patriarch Benedict I of Jerusalem; Professor John Karmiris wrote about the Vatican’s plan to promote the union of the Orthodox and Papist, stating: "Pope Paul VI and his circle of Papist theologians worked out a well-researched and broad program of Rome-centered Ecumenism, in agreement with Latin Ecclesiology." the Patriarchal Institute for Patristic Studies is established in Thessaloniki, located at the Holy Patriarchal and Stavropegial Monastery of Vlatadon (Moni Vlatadon).

1966 Professor Panagiotes K. Chrestou becomes the first director of the Patriarchal Institute for Patristic Studies (1966-1989), justly regarded as the leading Greek Patrologist of the 20th century; death of Ieronymos (Apostolides) of Aegina; Center for Byzantine Research established at the Aristotle University of Thessaloniki; translation of the sacred relics of the Holy Apostle Titus of Crete, from Venice (which had taken them in 1669), back to the Greek Orthodox Archdiocese of Crete; Greek–American academic and professor C. A. Patrides publishes Milton and the Christian Tradition, a classic study of John Milton's Christian theology.
1966–1980 About 160,000 Greeks emigrated to the USA.
1967 Glorification of Arsenios of Paros (†1877) by the Patriarchate of Constantinople; professor C. A. Patrides surveyed the history of apocatastasis in his Salvation of Satan.

Military dictatorship (1967–1974)

1967 The military junta which seized power in Greece on 21 April, adopted a new law which dismissed the twelve bishops of the Synod, the executive body of the sixty-seven member Assembly of Bishops, reduced the membership of the Synod to nine, and provided that the government, rather than the Assembly of Bishops, would elect the members of the Synod; on 13 May, eight members of the handpicked Aristindin Synod choose three candidates for the election of the Archbishop of Athens, of whom two, the Metropolitans of Patras and of Trikki, waived their candidacy in favour of the third, Archimandrite Ieronymos Kotsonis, who became the Archbishop of Athens and all Greece (1967–1973); on 1, 20 June and  22 the Aristindin Synod met to propose candidates for thirteen vacant sees, with most of the new bishops being sympathetically disposed towards the Zoe and Sotir Brotherhoods; Hieromonk Augoustinos Kantiotes elected Metropolitan of Florina, Prespai and Eordaia (1967-2000).
1968 Orthodox Academy of Crete (OAC) founded by the Archdiocese of Crete, near the Moni Gonia Monastery. the Pope removed from the Calendar of Saints the Great-Martyr St. George the Trophy-bearer and erased thirty other Saints with him, including Saint Nicholas, Saint Christopher, Saint Barbara, and Saint Catherine, being among the chief Saints of Orthodoxy.
1970 Death of Elder Amphilochios (Makris) of Patmos.

 1970–1971 In his survey of relics in the Greek Orthodox Church, German scholar Dr. Otto Meinardus found evidence for 3602 relics, out of approximately 3800 saints who were liturgically recognized by the end of the Ottoman period (1922).
1971 Halki Seminary, Orthodoxy's most prominent theological school, is closed by Turkish authorities breaching Article 40 of the Lausanne Treaty and Article 24 of the Turkish Constitution which both guarantee religious freedom and education; Abp. Makarios III (Mouskos) of Cyprus baptizes more than 5,000 into the Orthodox Church in Kenya, mostly from the Kikuyu tribe; the island of Tinos is proclaimed sacred by an act of parliament in 1971; the Church of Greece designated Pelagia of Tinos (†1834) a saint on 11 September.
1972–1973 Ecclesiastical coup in Cyprus fails to remove Abp. Makarios III from the Presidency.
1972 Death of missionary Archimandrite Chrysostomos Papasarantopoulos, having laboured to spread the Orthodox faith in Uganda, Kenya, Tanzania, and Congo; on 28 November, the Church of Greece reaffirmed its 1933 ban on Freemasonry, declaring and proclaiming that Freemasonry is a proven mystery religion.
1973 On 18 January the Synodal-Stavropegial Monastery of Panagia Chrysopigi («Παναγία η Χρυσοπηγή») is founded in Kapandriti, in the periphery of the Archdiocese of Athens, via a royal edict signed by Abp. Ieronimos Kotsonis of Athens; in Athens on Christmas 1973, an association called the "Theologians for Freedom and Dignity" published the document "Theological Declaration on Freedom and Dignity for Greek People from Greek Orthodox Theologians", denouncing the dictatorship in Greece.
1974 Turkish invasion of Cyprus, Turkish forces advance capturing the 37% of the island, 3,000 are killed or missing, 200,000 become refugees; the Monarchy is voted out by a plebiscite vote of 69%.

See also

Eastern Orthodoxy in Greece
List of archbishops of Athens
Greek Orthodox Church
Eastern Orthodox Church organization
History
History of the Eastern Orthodox Church
History of Eastern Christianity
History of the Eastern Orthodox Church under the Ottoman Empire
History of Eastern Orthodox Churches in the 20th century
Timeline of Eastern Orthodoxy in America
Church Fathers
Apostolic Fathers
Church Fathers
Ante-Nicene Fathers (book)
Desert Fathers
Nicene and Post-Nicene Fathers
List of Church Fathers

Notes

References

Bibliography
 Christos Yannaras. Orthodoxy and the West: Hellenic Self-Identity in the Modern Age. Transl. Peter Chamberas and Norman Russell. Brookline: Holy Cross Orthodox Press, 2006. 
 Giannēs Koliopoulos and Thanos Veremēs. Greece: The Modern Sequel, from 1831 to the Present. NYU Press, 2002. 407 pp. 
 C.M. Woodhouse. Modern Greece. 4th ed. Boston : Faber and Faber, 1986.
 Demetrios J. Constantelos. Understanding the Greek Orthodox Church: Its Faith, History and Life. 4th Edition. Brookline, Mass.: Hellenic College Press, 2005. 
 Dimitri E. Conomos, Graham Speake. Mount Athos, the Sacred Bridge: The Spirituality of the Holy Mountain. Oxford: Peter Lang, 2005.
 Effie Fokas. Religion in the Greek Public Sphere: Nuancing the Account. Journal of Modern Greek Studies. Volume 27, Number 2, October 2009, pp. 349–374.
 Herman A. Middleton. Precious Vessels of the Holy Spirit: The Lives & Counsels of Contemporary Elders of Greece. 2nd Ed. Protecting Veil Press, 2004.
 John L. Tomkinson. Between Heaven and Earth: The Greek Church. Anagnosis Books, Athens, 2004.
 Mother Nectaria McLees. EVLOGEITE! A Pilgrim's Guide to Greece. 1st Ed. St. Nicholas Press, Kansas City, MO, 2002. 927 pp.
 Norman Russell. Modern Greek Theologians and the Greek Fathers. Philosophy & Theology Volume 18, Issue 1. 2007.10.17. Pages 77–92.
 Rev. Dr. Nicon D. Patrinacos (M.A., D.Phil. (Oxon)). A Dictionary of Greek Orthodoxy – Λεξικον Ελληνικης Ορθοδοξιας. Light & Life Publishing, Minnesota, 1984.
 Rev. A. H. Hore. Eighteen centuries of the Orthodox Greek Church. London: James Parker & Co. 1899. 706pp. (Re-printed: Gorgias Press LLC, 2003.)

20th century in Greece
Cultural history of Greece
Greek Orthodoxy
Orthodoxy in Greece
 
Orthodox Church